Jan Marek Hartman (born 18 March 1967 in Wrocław) is a Polish of Jewish descent philosopher specializing in bioethics, writer, opinion journalist and politician, professor of the humanities.

Early life and education 
He is the son of mathematics professor  and a great-great grandson of rabbi Izaak Kramsztyk.

Hartman graduated from the Catholic University of Lublin in 1990. He received his PhD from the Jagiellonian University in 1995.

Career 

In 1994, Hartman was appointed an assistant professor at the Institute of Philosophy at the Jagiellonian University, then in 1995 an associate professor in the Department of Philosophy and Bioethics at the Jagiellonian University Medical College. In 2003 he became the head of the department, and in 2008 was appointed Full Professor of Humane Sciences.

Between 2013 and 2014, he was a member of Polish national ethics committee (Komisja do spraw etyki w ochronie zdrowia).

In his philosophical work Hartman focuses on ethics and bioethics, his scientific interests also include especially metaphilosophy and political philosophy.

Hartman is also known as a left-winged publicist, he's been publishing in magazines such as Gazeta Wyborcza, Tygodnik Powszechny, Dziennik Gazeta Prawna, Rzeczpospolita, Polityka, Newsweek Polska and Przekrój.

He is active in the politics. In 2011 Polish parliamentary election he was a candidate for the MP of Democratic Left Alliance. He received 2209 votes and didn't manage to get to the parliament.

Hartman had been a member of the anti-clerical Your Movement party from its inception in October 2013 to September 2014, having been considered one its key members. 2014 proved to be very onerous for the party when it received mere 3.6% of the votes in the elections to the European Parliament of 2014, lagging far behind its rivalry Democratic of the Left Alliance. The precarious voting results threatened the very existence of the party when many of its members quit. Despite proving his loyalty, Hartman soon lost his membership after publishing on his blog an article regarding recent debates on the legality of incest in Germany (by the Deutscher Ethikrat) and proposing to open a discussion on this topic in Poland. The public opinion was outraged and went as far as to accuse him of espousing incest, which he denied. Soon, a voting inside the party was held and Hartman was expelled, having lost 7 to 1. Hartman condemned the decision, criticising it as "curtailing freedom of speech in a party whose main precept was in fact freedom".

Personal life 
In 1989 Hartman married Barbara. Their daughter, Zofia, was born in 1998.

Books (selection) 
 Sposób istnienia rzeczy materialnej według Sporu o istnienie świata R. Ingardena, UMCS, Lublin 1993;
 Heurystyka filozoficzna, Monografie FNP, Wrocław 1997;
 Jak poważnie studiować filozofię, Aureus, Kraków 1998, 2005, 2012;
 Techniki metafilozofii, Aureus, Kraków 2001;
 Medytacje o filozofii pierwszej (translation of work by René Descartes), Zielona Sowa, Kraków 2002, 2004;
 Short Studies in Bioethics, Aureus, Kraków 2003;
 Wstęp do filozofii, Wydawnictwo Naukowe PWN, Warszawa 2005, 2006, 2008;
 Przez filozofię, Aureus, Kraków 2007;
 Wiedza o etyce (with Jan Woleński), Wydawnictwa Szkolne PWN, Bielsko-Biała 2008, 2009;
 Bioetyka dla lekarzy, Oficyna Wolters Kluwer Polska, Warszawa 2009, 2011;
 Widzialna ręka rynku. Filozofia w marketingu, Aureus, Kraków 2010;
 Polityka filozofii. Eseje, Universitas, Kraków 2010;
 Wiedza – Byt – Człowiek. Z głównych zagadnień filozofii, Universitas, Kraków 2011;
 Zebra Hartmana, Industrial, Łódź 2011;
 Głupie pytania, Agora, Warszawa 2013.
 Etyka. Poradnik dla grzeszników, Agora, Warszawa 2015.
 Polityka. Władza i nadzieja, Agora 2017.
 Pochwała litości. Rzecz o wspólnocie, Wyd. UJ, Kraków 2017.
 Pochwała wolności, Wyd. UJ, Kraków 2020.

References

External links 
 Loose Blues, Jan Hartman's blog

21st-century Polish philosophers
1967 births
Bioethicists
Living people
20th-century Polish Jews
21st-century Polish Jews
Jewish philosophers
John Paul II Catholic University of Lublin alumni
Academic staff of Jagiellonian University
Writers from Wrocław
Jagiellonian University alumni
Polish atheists
Jewish atheists